One Good Reason  may refer to:

 One Good Reason (album), an album by Paul Carrack, or the title song
 One Good Reason (song), the Dutch entry in the Eurovision Song Contest 1999, performed in English by Marlayne
 "One Good Reason", song by The Alan Parsons Project from Ammonia Avenue, 1984
 "One Good Reason", song by The Tubes from Love Bomb, 1985
 "One Good Reason", song by Dru Hill from Enter the Dru, 1998 
 "One Good Reason", song by Gary Moore from Dark Days in Paradise, 1997
 "One Good Reason", song by Celldweller from Celldweller
 "One Good Reason", song by Bryan Adams, B-side to "Straight from the Heart," 1983
 "One Good Reason", song by The Keys, 1981
 "One Good Reason", song by Mike Love, 1981
 "One Good Reason", song by Poison Girls, 1983
 "One Good Reason", song by The Swingers, 1979